Gastrotheca is a genus of frogs in the family Hemiphractidae. They are found in Central America south of Costa Rica and in South America. Most species occur in the American Cordillera from southern Costa Rica to north-western Argentina. This genus makes up the bulk of marsupial frog diversity; formerly it was placed in the "Leptodactylidae" assemblage.

Marsupial frogs are so-called because they possess a dorsal brood pouch. In some species the eggs are fertilized on the female's lower back, and are inserted in her pouch  with the aid of the male's toes. The eggs remain in contact with the female's vascular tissue, which provides them oxygen.

Gastrotheca guentheri (Guenther's marsupial frog) is the only known frog with true teeth in its lower jaw. Gastrotheca riobambae (Andean marsupial tree frog) is kept as pet and is used in scientific experiments.

Gastrotheca gemma was additionally discovered in 2021.

Species

There are 74 species recognized in the genus Gastrotheca :

 Gastrotheca abdita Duellman, 1987
 Gastrotheca aguaruna Duellman, Barley, and Venegas, 2014
 Gastrotheca albolineata (Lutz and Lutz, 1939)
 Gastrotheca andaquiensis Ruiz-Carranza and Hernández-Camacho, 1976
 Gastrotheca angustifrons (Boulenger, 1898)
 Gastrotheca antomia Ruiz-Carranza, Ardila-Robayo, Lynch, and Restrepo-Toro, 1997
 Gastrotheca antoniiochoai (De la Riva and Chaparro, 2005)
 Gastrotheca aratia Duellman, Barley, and Venegas, 2014
 Gastrotheca argenteovirens (Boettger, 1892)
 Gastrotheca atympana Duellman, Lehr, Rodríguez, and von May, 2004
 Gastrotheca aureomaculata Cochran and Goin, 1970
 Gastrotheca bufona Cochran and Goin, 1970
 Gastrotheca carinaceps Duellman, Trueb, and Lehr, 2006
 Gastrotheca christiani Laurent, 1967
 Gastrotheca chrysosticta Laurent, 1976
 Gastrotheca coeruleomaculatus (Werner, 1899)
 Gastrotheca cornuta (Boulenger, 1898)
 Gastrotheca cuencana Carvajal-Endara, Coloma, Morales-Mite, Guayasamin, Székely, and Duellman, 2019
 Gastrotheca dendronastes Duellman, 1983
 Gastrotheca dunni Lutz, 1977
 Gastrotheca dysprosita Duellman, 2013
 Gastrotheca elicioi Carvajal-Endara, Coloma, Morales-Mite, Guayasamin, Székely, and Duellman, 2019
 Gastrotheca ernestoi Miranda-Ribeiro, 1920
 Gastrotheca espeletia Duellman and Hillis, 1987
 Gastrotheca excubitor Duellman and Fritts, 1972
 Gastrotheca fissipes (Boulenger, 1888)
 Gastrotheca flamma Juncá and Nunes, 2008
 Gastrotheca fulvorufa (Andersson, 1911)
 Gastrotheca galeata Trueb and Duellman, 1978
 Gastrotheca gemma Venegas, García Ayachi, Echevarría, Paluh, Chávez-Arribasplata, Marchelie, & Catenazzi, 2021
 Gastrotheca gracilis Laurent, 1969
 Gastrotheca griswoldi Shreve, 1941
 Gastrotheca guentheri (Boulenger, 1882)
 Gastrotheca helenae Dunn, 1944
 Gastrotheca lateonota Duellman and Trueb, 1988
 Gastrotheca litonedis Duellman and Hillis, 1987
 Gastrotheca lojana Parker, 1932
 Gastrotheca longipes (Boulenger, 1882)
 Gastrotheca marsupiata (Duméril and Bibron, 1841)
 Gastrotheca megacephala Izecksohn, Carvalho-e-Silva, and Peixoto, 2009
 Gastrotheca microdiscus (Andersson, 1910)
 Gastrotheca monticola Barbour and Noble, 1920
 Gastrotheca nebulanastes Duellman, Catenazzi, and Blackburn, 2011
 Gastrotheca nicefori Gaige, 1933
 Gastrotheca ochoai Duellman and Fritts, 1972
 Gastrotheca oresbios Duellman and Venegas, 2016
 Gastrotheca orophylax Duellman and Pyles, 1980
 Gastrotheca ossilaginis Duellman and Venegas, 2005
 Gastrotheca ovifera (Lichtenstein and Weinland, 1854)
 Gastrotheca pacchamama Duellman, 1987
 Gastrotheca pachachacae Catenazzi and von May, 2011
 Gastrotheca peruana (Boulenger, 1900)
 Gastrotheca phalarosa Duellman and Venegas, 2005
 Gastrotheca phelloderma Lehr and Catenazzi, 2011
 Gastrotheca piperata Duellman and Köhler, 2005
 Gastrotheca plumbea (Boulenger, 1882)
 Gastrotheca prasina Teixeira, Vechio, Recoder, Carnaval, Strangas, Damasceno, Sena, and Rodrigues, 2012
 Gastrotheca pseustes Duellman and Hillis, 1987
 Gastrotheca psychrophila Duellman, 1974
 Gastrotheca pulchra Caramaschi and Rodrigues, 2007
 Gastrotheca rebeccae Duellman and Trueb, 1988
 Gastrotheca recava Teixeira, Vechio, Recoder, Carnaval, Strangas, Damasceno, Sena, and Rodrigues, 2012
 Gastrotheca riobambae (Fowler, 1913)
 Gastrotheca ruizi Duellman and Burrowes, 1986
 Gastrotheca spectabilis Duellman and Venegas, 2016
 Gastrotheca splendens (Schmidt, 1857)
 Gastrotheca stictopleura Duellman, Lehr, and Aguilar, 2001
 Gastrotheca testudinea (Jiménez de la Espada, 1870)
 Gastrotheca trachyceps Duellman, 1987
 Gastrotheca turnerorum Carvajal-Endara, Coloma, Morales-Mite, Guayasamin, Székely, and Duellman, 2019
 Gastrotheca walkeri Duellman, 1980
 Gastrotheca weinlandii (Steindachner, 1892)
 Gastrotheca williamsoni Gaige, 1922
 Gastrotheca yacuri Carvajal-Endara, Coloma, Morales-Mite, Guayasamin, Székely, and Duellman, 2019
 Gastrotheca zeugocystis Duellman, Lehr, Rodríguez, and von May, 2004

The AmphibiaWeb is listing 69 species as Gastrotheca lojana is not included.

Footnotes

References
 Duellman, W.E., Catenazzi, A. & Blackburn, D.C. (2011): A new species of marsupial frog (Anura: Hemiphractidae: Gastrotheca) from the Andes of southern Peru. Zootaxa 3095: 1-14.
 Faivovich, J., Haddad, C.F.B., Garcia, P.C.O., Frost, D.R., Campbell, J.A. & Wheeler, W.C. (2005): Systematic review of the frog family Hylidae, with special reference to Hylinae: Phylogenetic analysis and taxonomic revision. Bulletin of the American Museum of Natural History. 294: 1–240.

 
Hemiphractidae
Amphibian genera
Amphibians of Central America
Frogs of North America
Frogs of South America
Taxa named by Leopold Fitzinger